It's My Turn is a 1980 American romantic comedy-drama film starring Jill Clayburgh, Michael Douglas, and Charles Grodin.

The film was directed by Claudia Weill and written by Eleanor Bergstein.

Plot
Kate Gunzinger is a mathematics professor at a Chicago university. She lives with divorcé Homer, in a comfortable but not terribly passionate relationship.

Kate travels to New York for a job interview and to attend the wedding of her widowed father. She is offered the job, though it does not look promising, as she will not be able to continue doing research. She meets the bride's son, Ben Lewin, a former professional baseball player.

Ben is married, but a relationship develops with Kate. He takes her to Yankee Stadium for an old-timers' day ceremony, and eventually, they have an affair. When they part, Kate goes back to Chicago and breaks up with Homer. She returns to work, where she is greeted with a gift sent by Ben.

Cast

Production
The film's title track, "It's My Turn", played during the final credits, was sung by Diana Ross, with music by Michael Masser and lyrics by Carole Bayer Sager.

The film had a tumultuous production due to conflict between Weill and producer Ray Stark. After Stark's death, Weill said he "was a real bully, and so it was a difficult situation.” Weill claimed Stark would undermine her authority in front of the crew, and overly-scrutinize her work. Later she found out that while editing the movie, Stark had hired a shadow editor to cut a different version of the film. Due to the overall experience she directed no more films outside of television.

Critical reception
Roger Ebert of The Chicago Sun-Times gave the film 2 stars out of 4:

The film was nominated for a Razzie Award for Worst Screenplay for Eleanor Bergstein.

References

External links 

1980 films
1980s feminist films
1980 romantic comedy films
American romantic comedy films
Columbia Pictures films
1980s English-language films
Films scored by Patrick Williams
Films directed by Claudia Weill
Films set in New York City
Films shot in New York City
1980s American films